Ashley Jordan Smith-Brown (born 31 March 1996) is an English professional footballer who last played for Stalybridge Celtic. Primarily a left back, he has also been deployed as a right back owing to his two-footedness.

Club career

Manchester City
Smith-Brown joined the Manchester City youth academy at the age of 5 from Fletcher Moss Rangers He has played at multiple positions at the youth level including full back, wing back, and midfielder, and made his U18 debut at the age of 15. He was made a captain of the U18 team, leading them to a league title in 2013–14 season.

Loans
Smith-Brown was loaned to Dutch Eerste Divisie team NAC Breda for the 2016–17 season. He scored his first goal on 12 August, in a 2–1 win over Achilles '29.

In July 2017, Smith-Brown joined Scottish Premiership club Heart of Midlothian on a season-long loan. On 29 January, having struggled due to injury, he was recalled by Manchester City. In total he made three appearances for Hearts.

On 29 January 2018, Smith-Brown moved on loan to Oxford United until the end of the 2017–18 season, in which time he made nine appearances.

Plymouth Argyle
Smith-Brown signed for Plymouth Argyle on 26 June 2018 for an undisclosed fee, which manager Derek Adams later perhaps erroneously reported as "£10".
He was released by the club in January 2020.

Oldham Athletic
He joined Oldham Athletic on a season long loan in August 2019 but the loan was terminated in January 2020 in which he returned to Plymouth Argyle.

South Shields

On 6 October 2020, Smith-Brown signed for non-league side South Shields.

Farsley Celtic
On 30 October 2020, Smith-Brown joined Farsley Celtic.

Stalybridge Celtic
In July 2021 he joined Stalybridge Celtic.

He was released by the club in June 2022.

Career statistics

References

External links
England profile at The FA

1996 births
Living people
Footballers from Manchester
English footballers
England youth international footballers
Association football defenders
Fletcher Moss Rangers F.C. players
Manchester City F.C. players
NAC Breda players
Heart of Midlothian F.C. players
Oxford United F.C. players
Plymouth Argyle F.C. players
Eerste Divisie players
Scottish Professional Football League players
English Football League players
English expatriate footballers
Expatriate footballers in the Netherlands
English expatriate sportspeople in the Netherlands
Stalybridge Celtic F.C. players
Farsley Celtic F.C. players
South Shields F.C. (1974) players
Northern Premier League players